The Kiev Voivodeship (Kyjivśke vojevodstvo) was a unit of administrative division and local government in the Grand Duchy of Lithuania from 1471 until 1569 and of the Crown of the Kingdom of Poland from 1569 until 1793, as part of Lesser Poland Province of the Polish Crown.

The voivodeship was established in 1471 upon the death of the last prince of Kiev Simeon Olelkovich and transformation of the Duchy of Kiev (appanage duchy of the Grand Duchy of Lithuania) into the Voivodeship of Kiev.

Description
The voivodeship was established in 1471 under the order of King Casimir IV Jagiellon soon after the death of Semen Olelkovich. It had replaced the former Principality of Kiev, ruled by Lithuanian-Ruthenian Olelkovich princes (related to House of Algirdas and Olshansky family).

Its first administrative center was Kiev, but when the city was given to Imperial Russia in 1667 by Treaty of Andrusovo, the capital moved to Zhytomyr, where it remained until 1793.

It was the biggest voivodeship of the Polish–Lithuanian Commonwealth by land area, covering, among others, the land of Zaporizhian Cossacks.

Municipal government
The governor of the voivodeship was voivode (List of voivodes of Kiev). In the Polish–Lithuanian Commonwealth the other two major administrative positions were castellan and bishop (biskup kijowski).

 List of voivodes of Kiev 
 Castellan of Kijow (city governor)
 Vogt of Kijow

Flag and coat of arms
The flag on one side had Lithuanian Pogon on red field and on other side black bear on white field with his front left paw raised up.

Regional council (sejmik) 
 Zhytomyr

Regional council for all Ruthenian lands
 Sudova Vyshnia

Regional council seats
  Kive
  Ovruch
  Zhytomyr

Administrative division

Counties
 Kijow County, Kijow (Biała Cerkiew, Bila Tserkva, since 1659)
 Owrucz County, Owrucz
 Żytomierz County, Żytomierz

Other former counties
 Putywl County, Putywl (lost after the second Muscovite–Lithuanian War)
 Mozyrz County, Mozyrz (transferred to Minsk Voivodeship under the Union of Lublin)
 Czerkasy County, Czerkasy (liquidated in 1566)
 Czarnobyl County, Czarnobyl (liquidated in 1566)

Former counties lost under the Treaty of Andrusovo
 Lubecz County, Lubecz
 Oster County, Oster
 City of Kijow

Elderships (Starostwo)
Instead of some liquidated counties in 1566 there were established elderships: Biała Cerkiew, Kaniów, Korsun, Romanówka, Czerkasy, Czigrin.

Free royal cities
Berezań
Biała Cerkiew
Bohusław
Czehryń
Czerkasy
Jagodzin
Kaniów
Kijów
Korsuń
Myrhorod
Oster
Owrucz
Stebliw
Trechtymirów
Żytomierz

Neighbouring Voivodeships and regions
 Bratslav Voivodeship
 Podolian Voivodeship
 Brest Litovsk Voivodeship
 Minsk Voivodeship
 Chernihiv Voivodeship
 Grand Duchy of Moscow
 Crimean Khanate
 Yedisan

See also
List of voivodes of Kiev
List of Ukrainian rulers
Grand Prince of Kiev
List of Polish monarchs

References

 Kijow Voivodeship, description by Zygmunt Gloger

Further reading
Central European Superpower, Henryk Litwin, BUM Magazine, October 2016.
  Spisy pod red. Antoniego Gąsiorowskiego, t. III: Ziemie Ruskie, z. 4: Urzędnicy województw kijowskiego i czernihowskiego XV-XVIII wieku, opracowali Eugeniusz Janas i Witold Kłaczewski, Kórnik: Biblioteka Kórnicka. 2002. 343, .
  Witold Bobiński. Województwo kijowskie w czasach Zygmunta III Wazy: studium osadnictwa i stosunków własności ziemskiej. Warszawa. 2000.
  Henryk Litwin. Napływ szlachty polskiej na Ukrainę 1569–1648. Semper. 2000.  [also:] The Spatial Structure of the Kyiv Voivodeship and its Impact on the Political and Social Life of the Gentry in 1569–1648. Struktura przestrzenna województwa kijowskiego i jej wpływ na życie polityczne i społeczne szlachty w latach 1569–1648.
  Michał Kulecki. Wygnańcy ze Wschodu. Egzulanci w Rzeczypospolitej w ostatnich latach panowania Jana Kazimierza i za panowania Michała Korybuta Wiśniowieckiego. Warszawa 1997. .
  Dzieje rezydencji na dawnych kresach Rzeczypospolitej. Województwo kijowskie . OSSOLINEUM. 1997. 
  Zygmunt Gloger. Geografia historyczna ziem dawnej Polski. Kraków. 1903.
  Antoni Józef Rolle. Z przeszłości Polesia Kijowskiego. Warszawa. Red. Biblioteki Warszawskiej. 1882

External links

 Kyiv voivodeship in the Encyclopedia of Ukraine
 Cossack era on Ukrainian Government portal
The Zaphorozian Cossacks
  Województwo kijowskie [in:] Geographical Dictionary of the Kingdom of Poland and other slavic lands
 Palatinatus Kioviensis Pars. Boristhenem alias Dzikie Pola. .by Joannis Janssonii. Amsterdam. 1663.
 Der königlichen Republik Polen Woiwodschaft Kiow das ist die obere Polnische Ukraine oder Klein Polens oestlicher Theil. Nor. 46 Vienna. Franz Johann Josef von Reilly 1791
 Kyiv Voivodeship in the Encyclopedia of History of Ukraine

 
Voivodeships of the Polish–Lithuanian Commonwealth
Early Modern history of Ukraine
Former voivodeships of Grand Duchy of Lithuania
Geographic history of Ukraine
1471 establishments in Europe
15th-century establishments in Lithuania
1793 disestablishments in the Polish–Lithuanian Commonwealth
History of Kyiv
History of Kyiv Oblast